Robert Biere (fl. 1394) was an English Member of Parliament.

He was a Member (MP) of the Parliament of England for Shaftesbury in 1394.

References

14th-century births
Year of death missing
People from Shaftesbury
English MPs 1394